Namakula Mary Bata, (born  22 December 1993), commonly known as Mary Bata, is a Ugandan female songwriter, artist.

Background
Bata studied from Kabata Primary School, Maky College Secondary School Nateete and went to YMCA where she studied and was awarded a diploma in Cosmetology & Designing in 2013

Music career

Bata started as a singer in  a church choir before joining   Kream Productions Band in 2013.,
In 2014 released her  breakthrough  song  “Disappointment” and this song brought her   to the limelight of the Ugandan music., She had her first concert on 28 August 2015 at Theatre La Bonita in Kampala and it was a success.

Studio albums

Discography
{| class="wikitable"
|+Songs
!Song Title
!Year
|-
|Disappointment
|2014
|-
|Visa
|2014
|-
|Landlord
|2014
|-
|Salute
|2015
|-
|Hug
|2015
|-
|Waliwo Ekibaanja
|2016
|-
|Tugenda Komawo
|2016
|-
|Sembela
|2016
|-
|Ndugudde
|2016
|-
|Give me Time
|2016
|-
|Respect
|2016
|-
|Okimanyi
|2017
|-
|Mulimu Ki
|2017
|-
|Madowadowa
|2018
|-
|Am Ready
|2018
|-
|Akayimba
|2019
|-
|Follow You
|2020
|-
|Kookonyo
|2020
|-

Personal life
In August 2017, Mary survived an accident while she was from Mityana back to Kampala.

Awards & nominations

References

External links
Mary Bata at Youtube
Mary Bata Official Instagram Account
www.bukedde.co.ug

1993 births
Living people
Ugandan musicians